Murder by Natural Causes is a 1979 American television film directed by Robert Day and starring Hal Holbrook, Katharine Ross, Richard Anderson, and Barry Bostwick. It is a crime mystery written by the creators of the TV series Columbo: Richard Levinson and William Link.

Plot
A successful mentalist, Arthur Sinclair (Hal Holbrook), preys upon wealthy socialites such as Helen Carrington (Eve McVeagh) for their money. The movie opens as Arthur is talking on the phone with his much younger wife Allison (Katharine Ross). She wishes him luck as he departs to give an interview. However, she is in fact in bed with another, much younger man, Gil Weston (Barry Bostwick). Weston is a would-be actor in love with Allison, and we soon learn she is planning to have Gil kill Arthur by scaring him to death (by overloading his weakened heart). Their plan is to have Weston storm the house pretending to be a burglar – and then point his pistol at Arthur, who would supposedly die from the shock. The night comes and Gil breaks in. Gil presents himself as a journalist there to have an interview with Arthur. He and Gil have a hearty conversation, and it turns out that both men have something on each other. Gil knows that Arthur is a fake and that he somehow knew the information about a killer in a different town. Arthur knows that Gil is not a journalist. Gil is not panicked by that and he uses Arthur's competitive behavior to make him do 50 push-ups to allegedly tire out Arthur's heart. Soon Gil draws the gun, the two men struggle, and Arthur apparently shoots Gil. When Allison comes home, he is distraught by the incident; then Gil (Allison had loaded a blank bullet into the gun) comes behind him, and Arthur stumbles across the house and screams in pain...then laughs and applauds as the two lovers look on.

Arthur has known about Allison and Gil for months, and now he is out to get them. Then suddenly, Arthur's lawyer and longtime friend George (Richard Anderson) comes into the house. He turns out to be Allison's real lover; Gil was just a chump to do the dirty work. George shoots Arthur, then he and Allison depart. Some time afterwards, Allison returns to the house and finds that Arthur's body is gone. It turned out that Arthur knew about George, too, but Arthur wondered if George would actually go through with murder. Arthur had replaced all the bullets in the gun with blanks.

Arthur next points his pistol at Allison, now loaded with real bullets, and she asks him what is he going to do. Arthur replies: "I have a suggestion for you, darling...why don't you read my mind?"

Reception
This made-for-TV movie, which first aired on the CBS network on February 17, 1979, was well received by the critics and the viewers alike upon its original release. It  holds the rating of 8.0 on the Internet Movie Database. Its script was later turned into a successful stage play by the same writers.

Releases
This movie was broadcast in syndication a few times and then it was released on VHS.

References

External links

1979 films
American television films
1970s English-language films